Star Science Fiction Stories No.2 is the second book in the anthology series, Star Science Fiction Stories, edited by Frederik Pohl. It was first published in 1953 by Ballantine Books.

Contents
"Disappearing Act" by Alfred Bester
"The Clinic" by Theodore Sturgeon
"The Congruent People" by Algis Budrys
"Critical Factor" by Hal Clement
"It's a Good Life" by Jerome Bixby
"A Pound of Cure" by Lester del Rey
"The Purple Fields" by Robert Crane
"F Y I" by James Blish
"Conquest" by Anthony Boucher
"Hormones"  by Fletcher Pratt
"The Odor of Thought" by Robert Sheckley
"The Happiest Creature" by Jack Williamson
"The Remorseful" by C.M. Kornbluth
"Friend of the Family" by Richard Wilson

Reception
P. Schuyler Miller reviewed the anthology favorably, reported than many of the stories were "as good as you'll find anywhere."

References

External links

Anthopology 101: The Pohl Stars by Bud Webster, at Galactic Central

1953 anthologies
Star Science Fiction Stories anthology series
American anthologies
Ballantine Books books